Coco bread is eaten in Jamaica and other areas of the Caribbean. The bread contains some coconut milk, and is starchy and slightly sweet in taste. It is often split in half and stuffed with a Jamaican patty to form a sandwich in the same manner as a pasty barm.

History 
There is no certainty regarding when coco bread was first made and by whom; however, locals believe that coco bread was a product of enslaved Africans who worked on Caribbean sugar plantations. However, since then it has been popular within the Caribbean community.

See also

 Bammy 
 Bulla cakes
 Dumplings 
 Festivals
 Hard dough bread
 Caribbean cuisine
 List of Jamaican dishes

References

Jamaican cuisine
Caribbean cuisine
Foods containing coconut
Jamaican breads